The siege of Eshowe took place during the Anglo-Zulu War of 1879. The siege was part of a three-pronged attack on the Zulu Impis of king Cetshwayo at Ulundi. After an incursion as far as Eshowe (then also known as Fort Ekowe or kwaMondi) Colonel Charles Pearson was besieged there for two months by the Zulus.

Prelude

No. 1 Column
No. 1 Column of the British invasion force, under Colonel Charles Pearson, had been ordered to establish an advanced base at Eshowe before continuing the advance upon Ulundi. The force crossed the Tugela River from Natal into Zululand on 12 January 1879. The advance was unopposed until 22 January, when a Zulu force attempted to bar their way. A prominent knoll sat about halfway and there was a small kraal near the left of the crest.

Inyezane
Shortly after 08:00 a small number of Zulus appeared near the knoll on the ridge and a company of the Natal Native Contingent (NNC), under Lieutenant Hart, were sent up the spur after them. While this company gave chase a mass of Zulus appeared over the crest of the ridge and began pouring downwards. These men were the left "horn" of a 6,000 strong force, dispatched at the same time as the army that engaged the British at Isandlwana, who were preparing just over the crest, to attack the British camp. This left horn had been prompted into a premature attack by the advance of Lieutenant Hart's company and in the face of this advance the NNC fled, leaving their European officers and NCOs to make a fruitless stand before being swept aside. As soon as Hart and his men began firing, the camp prepared for defence, forming a hasty firing line. A naval company and two companies of Buffs with a Gatling gun and several 7-pounders moved up to the knoll, opening up across the advancing Zulu column. When the Zulus emerged from scrub and began their assault on the camp, they were subjected to massed fire from the flank and front; the Zulus wavered and then withdrew the way they had come.

While the left horn was being repulsed, the rest of the Zulu impi appeared over the crest. The kraal was taken and switching their guns to focus on it, the British force that had attacked the flank of the left horn advanced up the slope and captured the kraal. This position allowed the British to move the Gatling gun onto the crest where its rapid fire soon drove the Zulus off the centre and left end of the ridge, as the British mounted troops came up the right-hand spur to complete the action. The counter-attack resulted in 10 British killed and 16 wounded. The Zulu impi withdrew with 350 killed.

Eshowe

Eshowe consisted of a deserted church, school and the house of a Norwegian missionary. Low hills surrounded it about a quarter of a mile away to the north, east and west but to the south the Indian Ocean could be seen. Pearson sent a group of empty wagons with escorts to collect fresh supplies from the Lower Drift, while the rest of his force began to dig in. The next day, 24 January, bore a disturbing message for Pearson that Colonel Anthony Durnford's No. 2 Column had been wiped out in the Middle Drift, leaving the Lower Drift behind Eshowe in grave danger. If the Zulus took the lower drift, Eshowe would be cut off and there would be nothing between the Zulu Army and Natal.

Two days later, Lord Chelmsford contacted Pearson. Without giving any details of the disaster at the  Battle of Isandlwana he informed him that all orders were cancelled and that he was to take such as action as he thought fit to preserve his column, including withdrawal from Eshowe if necessary. If he withdrew, he was to hold the bridgehead at the Lower Drift but he might be attacked by the whole Zulu Army. Pearson had no precise information on the whereabouts of the Zulu and although his defences around the mission would soon be complete, it was not an ideal position to defend. His force had plenty of ammunition but other supplies were insufficient and the consensus of his subordinates was to pull back to the Lower Drift. The decision to stay was settled on when news arrived of the return of the supply wagons, with five further companies as reinforcement from the Lower Drift.

Siege

A second line of defence, should the outer rampart fall, was formed by laagering the wagons inside the walls. The garrison numbered 1,300 soldiers and sailors, plus 400 wagoners.

The appearance of large bodies of Zulu on the surrounding hills on 2 February, although they retreated under shelling from the 7-pounders, compelled Pearson to request reinforcements. A week later, he learned for the first time the full extent of the centre column's defeat at Isandlwana and was told that there could be no reinforcement. Pearson considered withdrawing part of his garrison, if Chelmsford agreed, but receiving no response and no further runners, it became clear that Eshowe had been cut off. The garrison would run out of provisions by the beginning of April.

February passed with no Zulu attack, save for sniping attacks and skirmishes between patrols. The beginning of March led Pearson to attack a kraal 7 miles away, to keep the soldiers from idling. The next day a heliograph was spotted signalling from Fort Tenedos and a makeshift apparatus allowed Eshowe to reply. The garrison learnt that a relief force would depart the Lower Drift on 13 March and that they were to advance to the Nyezane to meet it. This was cheering news for the garrison, with rations running low and sickness having killed 20 men. A few days later another message advised a delay in the arrival of the relief column until 1 April.

Relief Column

Lord Chelmsford led the relief column, consisting of 3,390 Europeans and 2,280 Africans to Eshowe. The artillery with the column consisted of two 9-pounder guns, four 24-pounder Congreve rockets tubes and two Gatling guns. The progress was slow, as in addition to taking a roundabout route to avoid ambush, the rivers they had to traverse were swollen by heavy rains. By the evening of 1 April, Pearson's observers at Eshowe could see the relief column laagering on the south bank of the Nyezane. The laager was sited on a 300-foot ridge running roughly west–east. West of the ridge, the ground dipped, only to rise again to the 470-foot Umisi Hill. The ground sloped away in all directions, allowing a good field of fire. A trench surrounded a waist high wall of earth, which enclosed 120 wagons formed a square with sides of 130 yards in length. Here the relief column fought the Battle of Gingindlovu, a British victory, before continuing on to Eshowe.

Eshowe relieved

On 3 April, the relief column entered Eshowe, led by the pipers of the 91st Highlanders. The two-month siege had been lifted. Chelmsford concluded that Eshowe did not need to be retained, and the laboriously constructed defences were demolished. Bivouacking on the first night after their departure from it on 6 April, Pearson's men could see that the Zulus had set Eshowe alight.

See also
 Military history of South Africa

References

Bibliography
 
 
 
 
 
 
 
 
 
 
 
 
 
 
 

Eshowe
1879 in the Zulu Kingdom
History of KwaZulu-Natal
Eshowe